Bay Lake is a body of water located in the Brainerd Lakes region of Minnesota. The Ojibway called the lake Ses-sa-beg-a-mah, which has been translated as "lake of many  bays" or "lake of many arms."

Like many other lakes in the area, Bay Lake is surrounded by commercial resorts and private cabins, and is a popular destination for fishing, boating, and water skiing. Access to the lake and resorts is via Minnesota State Highway 6 for the western shore and Crow Wing County Highway 10 for the eastern shore.

There are three islands on the lake.  The largest of these, the  Church Island, is used as a Lutheran church camp.  Outdoor services, open to the public, are held on the island each Sunday during the summer.

Bay Lake is part of the headwaters for the Ripple River, and the river is common spawning spot for fish.

See also
List of lakes in Minnesota

External links
 The Official Bay Lake Web Page 
 Minnesota DNR Lake Information
 Woodland Beach Resort
 Bay Lake at Brainerd.com
 Ruttger's Bay Lake Lodge
 Lonesome Pine Restaurant

Lakes of Crow Wing County, Minnesota
Lakes of Minnesota